"Bad Influence" is the fourth single from Pink's fifth studio album, Funhouse. The single was released on May 8, 2009 in Australia, however, it was not released as a single in Europe until March 2010. The track was certified Gold in Australia. It peaked at #6 on the Australian Singles Chart, as well at #56 on their Year-End chart.

Background and composition 
"Bad Influence" was written by Pink, with Billy Mann, Butch Walker, Robin Mortensen Lynch and Niklas Olovson, while production was handled by Machopsycho and Billy Mann. It is a rock chick party song that talks of going to a bar and having fun with female friends. Pink stated: "I’m with the Hindus on that one," the singer laughs. "Pleasure for pleasure’s sake is not a guilty sin." Anna Creeche from Blogcritics wrote that the line "I'm the instigator of underwear showing up here and there" is her favorite line from the entire album.P!nk vocal spans from the low note A2 to the high note D5

Critical reception 
Allmusic's editor Stephen Thomas Erlewine, picked the song as one of the best of the album and wrote a very positive review, stating that "the snotty stance is second nature to her, so maybe that's why Funhouse only really clicks when Pink abandons any pretense of mourning her relationship and just cuts loose with galumphing rhythms and schoolyard taunts, the kind that fuel 'Bad Influence' and make it instantly indelible." Joan Anderman from The Boston Globe agreed, writing: "It is a signature track, a fully cranked, reggae-flecked party tune celebrating the singer's, um, leadership skills." For Reed Fischer of Village Voice, in the song Pink echoes Gwen Stefani. Lucy Davies from BBC Music described it as "her L.O.V.E.-style getting-on-down-with-the-girls anthem." Anna Creech from Blogcritics commented about the lyrics, stating: "P!nk is, in many ways, fearless in her lyrics. Bristling at any perceived weakness while exposing her vulnerable side, she is "keeping it real" while also maintaining a healthy sense of humor."

Writing for The A.V. Club, Andy Battaglia gave the song a negative review, commenting: "It represents the worst of the album, with a pleased-as-punch inventory of Pink's own rebelliousness and a circus-like sound that claims to have some explanation for what it means to be 'the instigator of underwear'." Spencer D. from IGN criticized the song, writing that "Tracks like 'Bad Influence' have her sounding an awful lot like late 1990s PacNorWest Alt Rock darlings Harvey Danger, at least in terms of her cadence and vocal buoyancy."

Promotion
The song was chosen as the album's fourth single following its use in an Optus advertisement, promoting her Funhouse Tour. The track was also played frequently on Channel Pink on Channel V Australia, as well as becoming the theme for the Volkswagen Polo commercials in Europe.

Track listing
 "Bad Influence" - 3:35
 "Please Don't Leave Me" (Digital Dog Radio Edit) - 3:43

Chart performance
The song was the most added song to the radio in Australia in its first week of release. On the ARIA Singles Chart, the song peaked at number 6, and has been certified Gold, selling over 35,000 copies. On the Australian Airplay Chart, the song became Pink's 4th consecutive #1 song on the chart, and 4th from the album. In New Zealand, "Bad Influence" debuted at number thirty three on May 18, 2009, rising to number twenty seven the following week. It has so far peaked at number twelve. It entered the UK charts at #161 on 18 October 2009 because of the advert, peaked at #123. "Bad Influence" entered the German Singles Chart at #26 in April 2010. In the Netherlands, it didn't chart until April 2011.

Charts and certifications

Weekly charts

Year-end charts

Certifications

References

Pink (singer) songs
2009 singles
Songs written by Pink (singer)
Songs written by Butch Walker
Songs written by Billy Mann
Song recordings produced by MachoPsycho
2008 songs
LaFace Records singles
Sony Music singles